St. Theresa Point Airport  is located on St Mary Island  north of St. Theresa Point, Manitoba, Canada.

Airlines and destinations

References

Island Lake Tribal Council
Certified airports in Manitoba

Transport in Northern Manitoba